The Barack Obama Academy of International Studies, also known as Pittsburgh Obama 6-12, is a public school in the East Liberty neighborhood of Pittsburgh, Pennsylvania. The school is named in honor of Former President Barack Obama who served as 44th President of the United States.

Pittsburgh Obama is an International Baccalaureate school which was created when the Pittsburgh Public Schools combined Frick Middle School and Schenley High School. As of the 2017-2018 school year, Pittsburgh Obama is located in the former Peabody High School building. Before that, it was housed in the former Reizenstein Middle School building for three years.

The school is noted for its heavy involvement in the Pennsylvania YMCA Youth and Government program.

Enrollment

As of October 1, 2018:

References

External links
Pittsburgh Obama 6-12 website

Obama
High schools in Pittsburgh
Public high schools in Pennsylvania
Public middle schools in Pennsylvania
Educational institutions established in 2009
2009 establishments in Pennsylvania
International Baccalaureate schools in Pennsylvania